Oshali West Combined School is a school in Oshali West in the Ohangwena Region of northern Namibia. It belongs to the Endola Constituency.

References

Schools in Ohangwena Region